The women's 100 metre freestyle S10 competition at the 2018 Mediterranean Games was held on 25 June 2018 at the Campclar Aquatic Center.

Records

Results 
The final was held at 18:37.

References 

Women's 100 metre freestyle S10
2018 in women's swimming